Jack L. Gingrass (27 August 1921 – 23 January 2010) was an American politician who was a Democratic member of the Michigan House of Representatives, representing a portion of the Upper Peninsula in the 1960s and 1970s.

After attending Northern Michigan University, Gingrass served in the United States Army Air Corps during World War II. Gingrass was elected to the House in 1966 and served one term before being defeated for re-election by John Payant. Gingrass won the rematch in 1972 and served through 1984. After leaving the Legislature, he was appointed to the Lake Superior State University board of control where he served until his appointment to the Michigan State Transportation Commission by Governor John Engler in 1991. In 2000, he retired from the commission. Gingrass owned and operated a printing company, retiring from that in 2008.

References

1921 births
2010 deaths
20th-century American politicians
United States Army personnel of World War II
Democratic Party members of the Michigan House of Representatives
People from Marquette, Michigan
Northern Michigan University alumni
United States Army soldiers